Varangeren was a local Norwegian newspaper published once a week in Vadsø in Finnmark county. 

The newspaper was launched on August 8, 2007. It covered the municipality of Vadsø and was in strong competition with the newspaper Finnmarken. The paper was established and managed by Torbjørn Nordgård; Nordgård also managed the newspapers Østhavet in Vardø and Sør-Varanger Avis in Kirkenes. Varangeren was printed by Sør-Varanger Avis, which was also involved in the paper's ownership, together with Østhavet and local businesses in Vadsø. The paper was edited by Torbjørn Ittelin from 2007 to 2008, and by Gry Johanin from 2008 to 2012. Varangeren ceased publication in June 2012 after financially struggling for a long time because of low advertising revenues.

Circulation
According to the Norwegian Audit Bureau of Circulations and National Association of Local Newspapers, Varangeren had the following annual circulation:
 2007: 1,071
 2008: 1,176
 2009: 1,236
 2010: 1,219
 2011: 1,188

References

2007 establishments in Norway
2012 disestablishments in Norway
Defunct newspapers published in Norway
Mass media in Finnmark
Norwegian-language newspapers
Publications established in 2007
Publications disestablished in 2012
Vadsø